Richard Boys may refer to:
 Richard Boys (priest) (1783–1866), Church of England clergyman and author
 Richard Boys (cricketer) (1849–1896), English cricketer
 Richard James Boys (1930–2019), British statistician